Arey Lagoon is a bay on the Beaufort Sea coast of the U.S. state of Alaska. It is 7 miles (11 km) across and located between Arey Island and the mainland North Slope.

References

Bays of Alaska
Bodies of water of North Slope Borough, Alaska